Niel is a municipality located in the Belgian province of Antwerp. The municipality only comprises the town of Niel proper. In 2021, Niel had a total population of 10.493. The total area is 5.27 km².

History 
Niel used to belong to the Lordship of Mechelen. In 1462, it became part of the Duchy of Brabant. Niel became an independent parish in the 14th century. During most of its history, it was an agricultural community along the Rupel river. In the 19th century, Niel became an industrial town with brickworks, cement factories and shoe factories.

Sports 
Niel is home for Niel Jaarmarkt Cyclo-cross, a cyclo-cross race held in and around the town. The race is part of the Cyclo-cross Gazet van Antwerpen.

Notable people 
 Jan Decleir, actor, leading actor in the Academy Award winner Karakter was born in Niel

Gallery

References

External links
 
  Official website

Municipalities of Antwerp Province
Populated places in Antwerp Province